Matov is a Bulgarian masculine surname, its feminine counterpart is Matova. It may refer to
Hristo Matov (1872–1922), Bulgarian revolutionary, philologist, folklorist and publicist
Matov Peak in Antarctica named after Hristo Matov
Nonka Matova (born 1954), Bulgarian rifle shooter

Bulgarian-language surnames